Kuntur Samaña (Aymara kunturi condor, samaña to rest, 'where the condor rests', also spelled Condor Samaña) is a  mountain in the Bolivian Andes. It is located in the La Paz Department, Inquisivi Province, Colquiri Municipality. Kuntur Samaña lies at the Qala Uta River, northeast of Jach'a Warmi Qullu.

References 

Mountains of La Paz Department (Bolivia)